The 1872 United States presidential election in South Carolina took place on November 5, 1872. All contemporary 37 states were part of the 1872 United States presidential election. The state voters chose 7 electors to the Electoral College, which selected the president and vice president.

South Carolina was won by the Republican nominees, incumbent President Ulysses S. Grant of Illinois and his running mate Senator Henry Wilson of Massachusetts. Grant and Wilson defeated the Liberal Republican and Democratic nominees, former Congressman Horace Greeley of New York and his running mate former Senator and Governor Benjamin Gratz Brown of Missouri by a margin of 51.95%.

With 75.73% of the popular vote, South Carolina would be Grant's second strongest victory in terms of percentage in the popular vote after Vermont.

Results

References

South Carolina
1872
1872 South Carolina elections